The Official Women's Squash World Ranking is the official world ranking for women's squash. The ranking is to rate the performance level of female professional squash player. It is also a merit-based method used for determining entry and seeding in women's squash tournaments. The rankings are produced monthly. The current world number one is Nouran Gohar of Egypt, who replaced Raneem El Welily in July 2020.

The WISPA, the WSA and the PSA has used a computerized system for determining the rankings since April 1984.

PSA ranking policy
Players competing in PSA tournaments earn ranking points according to how far they get in the draw. The points available depend on the prize money and the draw size. The monthly rankings (issued on the 1st of the month) are used in selecting entries to tournaments and in determining the seeds.

The total number of points a player earns in the previous twelve months is divided by the number of tournaments played (a minimum divisor of ten is used) to give a ranking average. Where a player has played more than 9 tournaments the best scores may be selected (i.e. the lowest are not included) according to the Averaging Formula. (See table below.)

For example, a player who has competed in 13 events will have her best 10 scores used.  These will be accumulated and divided by 10.

Players competing in PSA World Tour Events earn ranking points according to the prize money, classification of the event, and the final position in the draw the player reaches.

Divisor
A divisor is selected based on the number of tournaments played during the year as shown in the table below (the minimum divisor is ten).  The average is calculated from the highest points scored for this number of events over the past twelve months:

Current world ranking

Note: The monthly ranking for the women's squash (world ranking) is taken directly from the Professional Squash Association (PSA) official website.

World number 1 since 1983

Number one ranked players

The following is a list of players who have achieved the world number one position since April 1983 (active players in green) :

Last update: February, 2022

Monthly world number 1 since 1983

2017–2020

2013–2016

2009–2012

2005–2008

2001–2004

1997–2000

1993–1996

1989–1992

1986–1988

1983–1985

Year end world top 10 players and ranking point tallies since 1994

2018-2020

2015-2017

2012-2014

2009-2011

2006–2008

Note: 
1) Natalie Grinham changed her nationality in 2008.

2003–2005

2000–2002

1997–1999

1994–1996

Year-end number 1

 1983:  Vicki Cardwell
 1984:  Susan Devoy
 1985:  Susan Devoy (2)
 1986:  Susan Devoy (3)
 1987:  Susan Devoy (4)
 1988:  Susan Devoy (5)
 1989:  Susan Devoy (6)
 1990:  Susan Devoy (7)
 1991:  Susan Devoy (8)
 1992:  Susan Devoy (9)
 1993:  Michelle Martin
 1994:  Michelle Martin (2)
 1995:  Michelle Martin (3)
 1996:  Sarah Fitz-Gerald
 1997:  Sarah Fitz-Gerald (2)
 1998:  Michelle Martin (4)
 1999:  Leilani Rorani
 2000:  Leilani Rorani (2)
 2001:  Sarah Fitz-Gerald (3)
 2002:  Sarah Fitz-Gerald (4)
 2003:  Carol Owens
 2004:  Rachael Grinham
 2005:  Vanessa Atkinson
 2006:  Nicol David
 2007:  Nicol David (2)
 2008:  Nicol David (3)
 2009:  Nicol David (4)
 2010:  Nicol David (5)
 2011:  Nicol David (6)
 2012:  Nicol David (7)
 2013:  Nicol David (8)
 2014:  Nicol David (9)
 2015:  Raneem El Weleily
 2016:  Nour El Sherbini
 2017:  Nour El Sherbini (2)
 2018:  Raneem El Weleily (2)
 2019:  Raneem El Weleily (3)
 2020:  Nour El Sherbini (3)

See also
 List of PSA women's number 1 ranked players
 PSA World Tour
 Official Men's Squash World Ranking
 List of PSA men's number 1 ranked players

Notes and references

External links
 PSA World Rankings website 
 WSA official world rankings website
 WISPA World Ranking history

Squash (sport)
Squash records and statistics
Squash